World Series of Fighting 25: Lightweight Tournament was a mixed martial arts event held  in Phoenix, Arizona, United States. This event aired on NBCSN in the U.S and on Fight Network in Canada.

Background
This event featured a one night only 8 Man Lightweight tournament to crown a number one contender for the WSOF Lightweight Championship.

On August 24, 2015, it was announced that The field of eight included Islam Mamedov, Mike Ricci, Joáo Zeferino, Rich Patishnock, Jorge Patino, Brian Cobb, Brian Foster and Luis Palomino. Joe Condon replaced Brian Cobb.

Results

Tournament bracket

 Patino fought as a replacement for Mamedov due to a torn ACL.
 Foster fought as a replacement for Ricci due to an injured hip.

See also 
 World Series of Fighting
 List of WSOF champions
 List of WSOF events

References

Events in Phoenix, Arizona
World Series of Fighting events
2015 in mixed martial arts